Yanggao Road station may refer to the following metro stations located in Shanghai, all part of the Shanghai Metro:
 North Yanggao Road station, on Line 12
 Middle Yanggao Road station, on Line 9
 South Yanggao Road station, on Line 7